388 Market Street is a 24-story,  mixed-use flatiron skyscraper, completed in 1987 on Market Street in the financial district of San Francisco, California. The building is clad in red granite. The top seven floors house luxury apartments, while the lower floors contain office space. It was designed by Skidmore, Owings & Merrill.

See also
 List of tallest buildings in San Francisco

External links
 388 Market

References

Skyscraper office buildings in San Francisco
Financial District, San Francisco
Market Street (San Francisco)
Office buildings completed in 1987
1980s architecture in the United States
Skidmore, Owings & Merrill buildings